Maj. Henry A. Meetze House is a historic home located near Lexington, Lexington County, South Carolina. It was built about 1855, and consists of a two-story, rectangular main block, with one-story side wings and a rear ell. The vernacular Italianate dwelling features a hipped roof with bracketed eaves, one and two-story porticoes with cast iron decoration, and bay windows. Also on the property is the original wellhouse and several sheds. Henry Meetze (1820-1904) was a prominent attorney, businessman and civic leader in the Lexington area.

It was listed on the National Register of Historic Places in 1979.

References

Houses on the National Register of Historic Places in South Carolina
Italianate architecture in South Carolina
Houses completed in 1855
Houses in Lexington County, South Carolina
National Register of Historic Places in Lexington County, South Carolina